Zygaena oxytropis is a species of moth in the Zygaenidae family. It is found in mainland Italy and on Sicily.

The larvae feed on Lotus corniculatus, Onobrychis montana and Onobrychis viciifolia.

Subspecies
Zygaena oxytropis oxytropis
Zygaena oxytropis acticola Burgeff, 1926
Zygaena oxytropis quercii Verity, 1920

References

Moths described in 1828
Zygaena
Endemic fauna of Italy
Moths of Europe